Euterpe luminosa is a species of flowering plant in the family Arecaceae. It is found only in Pasco Province of Peru. It is threatened by habitat loss.

References

luminosa
Endemic flora of Peru
Vulnerable plants
Plants described in 1991
Taxonomy articles created by Polbot